Humphrey Goudie Hunter (13 March 1916 – 1987) was a Scottish amateur footballer who played as an outside right in the Scottish League for Queen's Park. He was capped by Scotland at amateur level.

References 

1916 births
1987 deaths
Scottish footballers
Queen's Park F.C. players
Scottish Football League players
Scotland amateur international footballers
Footballers from Paisley, Renfrewshire
Association football outside forwards